Kamensky District is an administrative district (raion), one of the thirty in Sverdlovsk Oblast, Russia. As a municipal division, it is incorporated as Kamensky Urban Okrug. Its administrative center is the city of Kamensk-Uralsky (which is not administratively a part of the district). Population: 28,111 (2010 Census);

Administrative and municipal status
Within the framework of administrative divisions, Kamensky District is one of the thirty in the oblast. The city of Kamensk-Uralsky serves as its administrative center, despite being incorporated separately as an administrative unit with the status equal to that of the districts.

As a municipal division, the district is incorporated as Kamensky Urban Okrug. The City of Kamensk-Uralsky is incorporated separately from the district as Kamensk-Uralsky Urban Okrug.

References

Notes

Sources

Districts of Sverdlovsk Oblast

